Dating Hamlet is a novel written by Lisa Fiedler, first published in 2002. It is an example of novels that rewrite Shakespeare's plays to reflect the concerns of teenagers.

Plot
The plot of the story is largely the same as Shakespeare's Hamlet, but with a few twists in the tale. The story centres on Ophelia and her views on the activities taking place in Denmark and how they affect Hamlet. The author turns the story on its head by making Ophelia the heroine of the story. She is the one who comes up with the plans to save Hamlet. She is the one who proves to be brave while Hamlet appears weak and is left to follow.

The novel is a retelling of Hamlet from Ophelia's point of view.

References

Sources

2002 American novels
American historical novels
Novels based on Hamlet
Henry Holt and Company books
Novels set in Denmark